A kid hack was a horse-drawn vehicle used for transporting children to school in the late 19th and early 20th centuries in the United States. The word "hack," meaning a horse-drawn cab, is short for hackney carriage. The vehicle was actually powered by both horses and mules and was usually loaded at the rear to avoid frightening the animals. In those days, most elementary school children in rural areas attended one-room schools. A typical kid hack would serve all the farms in the area of the school, and usually transport under 20 children. 

The horse-drawn kid hack is considered to be the precursor to the modern yellow school bus. As early as 1914, versions of kid hacks were attached to early motor vehicles by the Wayne Works in Richmond, Indiana. As motorized trucks became more commonplace in rural locations, detachable wooden kid hack bodies were made so it could be removed when the truck was in other use. Around 1927, much heavier all-steel bodies were introduced for this purpose by Wayne Works and other companies. Permanently mounted on the truck chassis, the combined vehicle became known as a school bus.     

The Wayne County Historical Museum in Richmond, Indiana has a restored horse-drawn "kid hack" on display.

See also
School bus
Blue Bird Corporation
Wayne Corporation

External links
Wayne County Historical Museum, Richmond, Indiana

Wagons
Buses by type
History of education in the United States
19th century in the United States
20th century in the United States
19th century in education
20th century in education
19th century in transport
20th century in transport